The 1930 college football season saw Notre Dame repeat as national champion under the Dickinson System, as well as claim the No. 1 position from each of the other three contemporary major selectors, (the Boand, Dunkel, and Houlgate Systems). The post-season Rose Bowl matchup featured two unbeaten (9–0) teams, Washington State and Alabama, ranked No. 2 and No. 3, respectively.  Alabama won the Pasadena contest, 24–0.

Conference and program changes

Conference changes
Three conferences played their first seasons in 1930:
Dixie Conference – the first of three conferences to share the Dixie Conference name; ended football sponsorship after 1941
Michigan-Ontario Collegiate Conference – minor conference with members in Michigan, Ohio, and the Canadian province of Ontario; ended football sponsorship after 1941
North State Conference – later known as Conference Carolinas; ended football sponsorship in 1973

Membership changes

Program changes
 Stanford University football officially adopted the Indians nickname.

September
September 20 Stanford opened its season against a non-college team, beating the West Coast Army club, 32–0

September 27 Nearly all the big schools scheduled tune-up games against weaker visitors, and all but one shut out the opposition.  Michigan opened its season with a doubleheader, beating Denison 33–0 and Eastern Michigan 7–0.  Other schools rolled up high scores, as  Stanford beat the Olympic Club, 18–0; Army beat Boston University 39–0; Alabama beat Samford, 43–0; USC rolled over UCLA 52–0; Tennessee beat Maryville College 54–0; Dartmouth beat Norwich College 79–0; and Tulane defeated Lafayette College of Louisiana, 84–0.  Only Washington State was scored upon, getting a surprise from the Coyotes of College of Idaho, which unleashed a surprise passing attack for two touchdowns (and 12 of 19 completions) in the fourth quarter.  WSU won 47–12.

October

October 4  Notre Dame opened its season with a 20–14 win over visiting Southern Methodist.  
Northwestern beat visiting Tulane, 14–0.  Washington State won at California 16–0 and USC beat visiting Oregon State 27–7, while Stanford defeated Santa Clara 20–0.  Dartmouth beat Bates 20–0 and Army beat Furman, 54–0.  Alabama rolled over visiting Ole Miss, 64–0 and in Danville, Kentucky, Tennessee defeated Centre College 18–0.  Michigan and Michigan State played to a scoreless tie.

October 11 Washington State edged visiting USC 7–6.
Notre Dame beat Navy 26–2.   Northwestern beat Ohio State 19–2, and Michigan narrowly won over Purdue 14–13.  Dartmouth crushed visiting Boston University 74–0, and Army beat Swarthmore 39–0.  Tennessee beat Ole Miss 27–0. In Birmingham, Alabama shut out Sewanee 25–0, and in Dallas, Tulane beat Texas A&M 19–9.  In Minneapolis, Stanford and Minnesota played to a 0–0 tie.

October 18 Alabama and Tennessee, both 3–0–0, and both unscored upon, met at Tuscaloosa in a game that would ultimately determine the fictional championship of the South.  Alabama won 18–6.
Notre Dame beat Carnegie Tech 21–6.   Northwestern won at Illinois 32–0  and Michigan won at Ohio State, 13–0  USC won at Utah State 65–0, Washington State won in Spokane at Gonzaga University, 24–0, and Stanford beat Oregon State 13–7.  Dartmouth beat Columbia 52–0 and Army defeated Harvard, 6–0.  Tulane defeated Birmingham Southern College 21–0

October 25 Alabama and Vanderbilt, both 4–0–0, met at Birmingham.  In another close game, Alabama won 12–7.  USC (3–1–0) and Stanford (3–0–1) met in Palo Alto, with the Trojans handing the Indians their first loss of the season, 41–12.   Notre Dame won at Pittsburgh 35–19.  Washington State beat visiting Montana, 61–0.  Northwestern beat Centre College 45–7 and Michigan beat Illinois 15–7.(Dartmouth was scored upon, winning at Harvard 7–2, and Army's streak of shutouts ended with its 7–7 tie at Yale.  Tennessee beat visiting North Carolina 9–7, and in Atlanta, Tulane shut out Georgia Tech 28–0.

November
November 1 Dartmouth (5–0–0) and (3–1–1) Yale (3–1–1) played to a 0–0 tie in New Haven.  Notre Dame beat Indiana 27–0 and Northwestern won at Minnesota 27–6  USC beat Denver, 33–13.  
Army defeated visiting North Dakota 33–6.  In Portland, Washington State defeated Oregon State 14–7.  Alabama won at Kentucky, 19–0, Tennessee beat Clemson 27–0 and Tulane beat Mississippi State 53–0

November 8 Notre Dame beat Pennsylvania 60–20.  Washington State won at Idaho 33–7.  Northwestern won at Indiana 25–0 and Michigan won at Harvard 6–3.  Army defeated Illinois at Yankee Stadium, 13–0.
USC beat California 74–0 and Stanford beat Washington 25–7
Alabama won at Florida, 20–0, Tulane beat Auburn 21–0, and Allegheny College did what no other team had done that season, scoring two touchdowns against Dartmouth; the Big Green won 43–14 to stay unbeaten.  Tennessee shut out Carson-Newman College 34–0

November 15  Tennessee and Vanderbilt University, both 6–1–0, met at Nashville, with Tennessee winning 13–0. 
Notre Dame defeated Drake University 28–7.  In Seattle, Washington State won another close one, beating Washington 3–0.  Alabama beat LSU in a game at Montgomery, Alabama, 33–0, while Tulane (6–1–0) and Georgia (6–0–1) met at New Orleans, with Tulane handing the Bulldogs their first loss, 25–0
Northwestern beat Wisconsin 20–7 and Michigan beat Minnesota 7–0
USC defeated visiting Hawaii 52–0, while Stanford beat Caltech, 57–7  
Dartmouth won at Cornell 19–13.  Army beat Kentucky Wesleyan 47–2

November 22 Notre Dame and Northwestern, both unbeaten (7–0–0) met at Evanston, with the Fighting Irish winning 14–0.  Michigan beat Chicago 16–0
Stanford won at California 41–0.  Army defeated Ursinus College 18–0.

November 27, Thanksgiving Day, Alabama (8–0–0) met Georgia (6–1–1) in Birmingham.  The Crimson Tide extended its unbeaten streak, 13–0, to close the regular season unbeaten.  The champion of the South also earned a Rose Bowl invitation to face Washington State.  USC beat Washington 32–0.  Tennessee defeated Kentucky 8–0 and Tulane won over LSU, 12–7.

November 29 (8–0–0) Notre Dame and (8–0–1) Army met at Chicago, with the Irish narrowly winning 7–6.  In Philadelphia, Washington State beat Villanova, 13–0, to close its season 9–0–0.  (8–1–1)Stanford hosted (7–0–1) Dartmouth and won 14–7

December
Although the Rose Bowl was the lone postseason game, and other bowl games were still four years in the future, several big contests were played after most colleges had completed their seasons.

December 6 In Los Angeles, a crowd of 90,000 turned out at the Coliseum as Notre Dame (9–0–0) visited USC (8–1–0).  While some predicted a Trojans win, or at least a close game, "Rockne's Ramblers" scored six minutes into the game and never looked back.  Paul O'Connor, a third string player earlier in the season, had 11 carries for 142 yards, and one touchdown.  The Irish closed their season with a decisive 27–0 victory  and with another victory over a tough opponent, finished first in the Dickinson ratings.   Nobody realized at the time that Knute Rockne had coached his final game.  Rockne was killed in a plane crash on March 31, 1931.  At Jacksonville, Tennessee defeated Florida 13–6.

December 13 In the Army–Navy Game, played in New York, Army won 6–0 to close its season at 9–1–1.

1931 Rose Bowl

The Rose Bowl stadium's capacity had been increased to 81,000, but only 65,000 spectators turned out to watch an East-West matchup between two unbeaten (9–0–0), but out-of-state teams, the Washington State Cougars and the Alabama Crimson Tide.  It was the Cougars who were decked out in crimson, however, in what reports of the day described as "a bizarre touch".  Besides solid red jerseys, pants and socks, the WSU players had bright red leather helmets and shoes.

Freddie Sington, Bama's star tackle/linebacker, was pitted against WSU's Turk Edwards, and blocked WSU's only chance to score.  In addition, Sington blocked for the rushing of Johnny Campbell, "The Mississippi Rabbit", who ran 42 yards for one of Alabama's three touchdowns in the second quarter.  After a 21–0 halftime lead, Alabama went on to a 24–0 win.

Conference standings

Major conference standings

Independents

Minor conferences

Minor conference standings

Dickinson System
The AP sportswriters' poll would not begin continuously until 1936. (although, the first time was a one instance publishing in 1934)  Frank G. Dickinson, an economics professor at the University of Illinois, had invented the Dickinson System to rank colleges based upon their records and the strength of their opposition.

The system was originally designed to rank teams in the Big Nine (later the Big Ten) conference.  Chicago clothing manufacturer Jack Rissman then persuaded Dickinson to rank the nation's teams under the system, and awarded the Rissman Trophy to the winning university.

The system awarded 30 points for a win over a "strong team", and 20 for a win over a "weak team".  Losses were awarded points (15 for loss to a strong team, 10 for loss to a weak team).  Ties were treated as half a win and half a loss (22.5 for a tie with a strong team, 15 for a tie with a weak team).  An average was then derived by dividing the points by games played.

Final Dickinson rankings
Notre Dame, Washington State and Alabama, all unbeaten and untied at the end of the regular season, were ranked first, second and third by Dickinson, with the Irish getting the higher rating based on their opposition.  The ratings were made before the 1931 Rose Bowl that matched Washington State and Alabama, with Alabama winning, 24 to 0.   Notre Dame did not participate in a postseason bowl game.

See also
1930 College Football All-America Team

References